The COLCOA French Film Festival (formerly "City of Light, City of Angels") is an annual competitive film festival in Hollywood, created and presented by the Franco-American Cultural Fund (FACF), a unique partnership of the DGA, the MPAA, la SACEM and the WGA West. The goals of the festival are to showcase the diversity of French cinema and TV series, to promote French films and talent among the film industry and to contribute to cross cultural understanding. The COLCOA French Film Festival is open to professionals and general audience.

The 24th edition was scheduled from September 21-27, 2020. However, on June 30, 2020, the FACF has announced the postponing of the event because of  the Covid 19 pandemic situation in the United States and particularly in California. On May 27, 2021, the FACF confirmed that the festival will celebrate its 25th anniversary as a live event on November 1-7, 2021 at the Directors Guild of America theater complex in Hollywood.

Background

COLCOA was created in 1997 by The Franco-American Cultural Fund, a unique collaborative effort of the Directors Guild Of America, the Motion Picture Association of America, the Writers Guild of America, West, and France's Société des Auteurs, Compositeurs et Éditeurs de Musique(SACEM). The festival is also made possible with the support of L'ARP (France's Association of Authors, Directors and Producers), the Film & TV Department of the French Embassy, TV France International and Unifrance.

Since 2004, the selection is exclusively composed of premieres in Hollywood. Several high-profile features are presented at COLCOA for the first time in North America or in the U.S. Some can be International or World premieres. COLCOA is also known for premiering films before their commercial release in the U.S., and for being used by American distributors to launch and promote their film in Hollywood. After 22 years in April, the festival has moved to September in 2019 to become the first event of the Awards Season in Hollywood. Following this first edition in Fall, three of the programs premiered at COLCOA were nominated for the 2020 Academy Awards: "LES MISERABLES"(presented with Amazon Studios)(Best International Film), "I LOST MY BODY" (presented with Netflix)(Best Animated Feature) and "MEMORABLE"(Best Animated short). 

The selection includes features, documentaries, animated films, short films and, since 2015, TV movies and TV series. In 23 years, 900 films or TV series have been selected. COLCOA has constantly developed to become a showcase of 60 films in 2019, with a capacity of 20,000 and an occupancy rate of 91%. Its exclusive program has made of COLCOA an anticipated date in the industry calendar and one of the largest French film festivals in the world. 

The COLCOA audience is mainly composed of film industry professionals, including directors, writers, distributors, producers, agents, exhibitors, critics and journalists. COLCOA has developed partnerships with organizations like IFTA, The Cannes Film Market, Film Independent, Women in Film, The American Cinematheque, SAG, and since 2008, the Hollywood Foreign Press Association and the Los Angeles Film Critics Association.

In 2008, an educational program was launched to promote foreign films among young American audiences in association with European Languages and Movies in America (ELMA). More than 30,000 students and 160 high schools have participated in the program since 2008. In 2010, a master class program was introduced for colleges, film schools and universities.

For years, the festival has been leader for the place dedicated to female filmmakers in the selection. In 2019, 40% of the films and series presented were directed by women. COLCOA is committed to do its best to reach the parity in the next years.

Award winners
Since 2005, films selected compete for the annual COLCOA AWARDS.

References

External links 
 Official site

Cinema of France
Film festivals in Los Angeles